Kelvin Calder MacKenzie (born 22 October 1946) is an English media executive and a former newspaper editor. He became editor of The Sun in 1981, by which time the publication was established as Britain's largest circulation newspaper. After leaving The Sun in 1994, he was appointed to executive roles in satellite television and other broadcasting outlets, as well as being involved in a number of publishing enterprises.

After short periods as a columnist at the Daily Mail and The Daily Telegraph, MacKenzie returned to The Sun in the same role. His contract was terminated by mutual consent in May 2017 after being suspended.

Early life and career
MacKenzie was born in Thanet, Kent, to Ian and Mary MacKenzie, both journalists working for The South London Observer. When the South London Press took over their paper, Mary became press chief for the Conservative leader of the Greater London Council, Horace Cutler. Educated at Alleyn's School in Dulwich, MacKenzie left school with one O-level in English literature. He joined the South East London Mercury at 17, and worked on local and then national newspapers, including the Daily Express, for the next ten years.

MacKenzie has said that he discovered early on in his career that he had little writing ability and that his talents lay in making up headlines and laying out pages. By 1978, at the age of 32, he was managing editor of the New York Post, two years after it had been purchased by Rupert Murdoch.

Editor of The Sun
After moving back to the United Kingdom and a period as night editor of the Daily Express, Murdoch appointed him The Sun editor in 1981. Conflict between the two groups meant that MacKenzie performed both jobs for a time.

In 1978, The Sun had finally overtaken the Daily Mirror in circulation becoming the newspaper with the highest sales in the UK. It was MacKenzie though who cemented the paper's image as a right-wing tabloid, not only increasing its profile, but also making it known for its attacks on left-wing political figures and movements and its sensationalist front-page celebrity exposés. These often proved to be misleading or false, with many controversies in this area occurring during MacKenzie editorship. Commentators including The Guardian contributor Roy Greenslade and journalist John Pilger have commented on the alleged "Murdoch effect". MacKenzie himself stated that he feels that his own spell as editor of The Sun had a "positively downhill impact on journalism".

MacKenzie is quoted as saying in the early 1980s (on the subject of how he perceived The Suns target audience):

The paper was frequently accused of dumbing down public discourse because of its preoccupations; Pilger blamed it for the promotion of jingoism, racism, homophobia, and intolerance.

MacKenzie was widely criticised for his perceived cruelty to both the targets of his – sometimes false – newspaper allegations; his choice of targets frequently being not only left-wing politicians and celebrities but even ordinary members of the public, and also his alleged cruelty to his own staff and colleagues, to which MacKenzie has since responded:

Headlines

MacKenzie was responsible for the "Gotcha" front-page headline of 4 May 1982, which reported the contentious sinking of the Argentinian cruiser General Belgrano by a British submarine during the Falklands War. MacKenzie was heavily condemned by some commentators who felt he was glorifying death and the headline caused a storm of controversy and protest, although MacKenzie had actually changed the front-page of later editions to "Did 1,200 Argies drown?" after it was established that there had been a large number of Argentine casualties. MacKenzie later defended his "Gotcha" headline, saying:

Despite MacKenzie's self-professed pride at having printed the "Gotcha" headline, Roy Greenslade has said that he had only chosen the headline prior to it becoming clear that there had been a large number of Argentine casualties resulting from the sinking of the Belgrano and that even he later became concerned that the headline may be seen as insensitive and distasteful.

Greenslade states that MacKenzie insisted on changing the headline to "Did 1,200 Argies Die?" for later editions because of these concerns, and that he did so against the wishes of Rupert Murdoch, present in the newspaper building at the time because of an industrial dispute, who reputedly demanded that the "Gotcha" headline remain, despite the large number of casualties and later said of the headline, "I rather liked it". This is reportedly the only occasion that MacKenzie ever disobeyed a specific order from Murdoch.

MacKenzie's coverage of the Falklands War was criticised by some commentators for being a glorification of war (Greenslade was working with MacKenzie on The Sun at the time).

MacKenzie was responsible for the "Freddie Starr Ate My Hamster" front-page headline. The claims made in the accompanying article, that the comedian Freddie Starr had placed his girlfriend's hamster on a sandwich and proceeded to eat it, turned out to be entirely untrue and an invention of the publicist Max Clifford. The headline is often held up as the prime example of The Sun'''s supposedly celebrity-obsessed, sensationalist and often inaccurate journalism.

Politics
In the general elections which were held during his time as editor, MacKenzie's Sun strongly supported the Conservative Party and its policies.

Although the coverage of the 1992 election is particularly prominent, there were many other vitriolic personal attacks on Labour leaders by MacKenzie's Sun during elections, such as in the 1983 campaign, when MacKenzie ran a front page featuring an unflattering photograph of Michael Foot, then nearly 70 years old, alongside the headline "Do You Really Want This Old Fool To Run Britain?".

MacKenzie's coverage of the British miners' strike in 1984–1985 supported the police and the Thatcher government against the striking NUM miners. The paper was accused of making misleading or even outright false claims about the miners, their unions and leader Arthur Scargill. MacKenzie at one point prepared a front page with the headline "Mine Führer" and a photograph of Scargill with his arm in the air, a pose giving the appearance of him making a Nazi salute. The print workers at The Sun, regarding it as an attempt at a cheap smear, refused to print it.

At the time of the 1987 general election MacKenzie ran a mock-editorial entitled "Why I'm Backing Kinnock, by Joseph Stalin".

On the day of the 1992 election MacKenzie used the front-page headline "If Kinnock Wins Today, Will The Last Person To Leave Britain Please Turn Out The Lights", accompanied by a picture of Kinnock's head superimposed over a lightbulb. While the paper initially supported the government of John Major, because it appeared that Major himself shared the ideological hostility of Thatcher towards European integration, this soon changed. Following the UK's forced exit from the European Exchange Rate Mechanism on Black Wednesday in September 1992, according to MacKenzie, Major telephoned him to ask about how the paper would report the story. While Major has denied the conversation ever took place, MacKenzie has claimed his response was: "Prime Minister, I have on my desk in front of me a very large bucket of shit which I am just about to pour all over you."

Invented stories
In January 1987, MacKenzie published a totally unfounded front-page story alleging that pop singer Elton John had had sex with underage rentboys. Shortly afterwards, MacKenzie published further entirely false allegations that the singer had had the voiceboxes of his guard dogs removed because their barking kept him awake at night. MacKenzie confirmed their inaccuracy shortly after publication by sending a reporter to the singer's house, who quickly discovered that all of his guard dogs were quite capable of barking.

MacKenzie later said that in retrospect he found it difficult to understand why he had believed, never mind published, the claims about the guard dogs which he later realised were self-evidently absurd. Elton John sued The Sun for libel over both these claims and was later awarded £1,000,000 in damages. MacKenzie later said of Elton John:

There were many other controversies during MacKenzie's time in charge of The Sun. MacKenzie at one point ran a story about a previously unknown member of the public who had just undergone a heart transplant operation, the story denouncing the man as a "love rat", Sun journalists having been told that he had left his wife 15 years earlier. Aside from criticism about the story's highly questionable news value, the newspaper was furiously condemned as the story was run when the man's recovery was still in the balance.

MacKenzie and his team were accused of simply inventing many of the stories that appeared in the newspaper, as well as interviews, and in some instances this proved to be the case, such as when an entirely fabricated interview with the disfigured Falklands war hero Simon Weston was published, which was criticised for "inviting readers to feel revulsion at his disfigurement". MacKenzie himself once told his staff: "Give me a Sunday for Monday splash on the royals. Don't worry if it's not true—so long as there's not too much of a fuss about it afterwards."

Some other controversies that occurred under MacKenzie include a headline describing Australian Aborigines as "The Abo's: Brutal and Treacherous" (which was condemned as "inaccurate" and "unacceptably racist" by the Press Council) and MacKenzie's sending of photographers to break into a psychiatric hospital to ask actor Jeremy Brett, who was a patient in the hospital at the time and who was suffering from manic depression and dying of cardiomyopathy, whether he was "dying of AIDS". The newspaper apparently suspected Brett of being a homosexual and that his mystery illness might be AIDS, which it was not.

These incidents caused The Sun to be criticised, but the newspaper's profile increased dramatically during MacKenzie's time as editor although sales figures dipped. On the subject of the sensationalist and sometimes inaccurate reporting which appeared in The Sun during his time as editor, MacKenzie has said:

Hillsborough disaster coverage

In April 1989, the single biggest controversy during MacKenzie's period as editor, later described in a Sun editorial in 2004 as "the most terrible mistake in our history", occurred during the aftermath of the Hillsborough disaster, a deadly crush which occurred during an FA Cup semi-final at Hillsborough football stadium in Sheffield claiming the lives of 97 Liverpool fans.

Three days after the disaster, The Sun published an editorial which accused people of "scapegoating" the police, saying that the disaster occurred "because thousands of fans, many without tickets tried to get into the ground just before kick-off – either by forcing their way in or by blackmailing the police into opening the gates". The next day, it printed the front-page headline "The Truth", accusing Liverpool fans of theft and of urinating on and attacking police officers and emergency services. It quoted Conservative Member of Parliament Irvine Patnick in its claim that a group of Liverpool supporters told a police officer that they would have sex with a dead female victim. The journalist who wrote the first draft, Harry Arnold, said that MacKenzie claimed he would "make it clear that this is what some people are saying", but MacKenzie chose the headline "The Truth" after staff members convinced him not to use "You Scum". Its source was a Sheffield news agency, Whites, which later said that four South Yorkshire Police officers originated the claims.

The article was accompanied by graphic photographs showing Liverpool fans, including young children, choking and suffocating as they were being crushed against the perimeter fences surrounding the terraces – this was widely condemned as inappropriate.

In their book about the history of The Sun, Peter Chippindale and Chris Horrie wrote:

Prior to the publication of The Suns initial article, a number of local newspapers in Yorkshire, such as the Sheffield Star and The Yorkshire Post, published very similar allegations. It has since emerged that many British national newspaper editors were offered the same story from the same sources the day before The Sun article was published but while many national newspapers printed allegations about Liverpool fans being responsible for the disaster, only MacKenzie and his counterpart at the Daily Star newspaper were prepared to print the more outlandish allegations about theft and abuse of dead bodies, with many editors feeling that the claims sounded dubious. Furthermore, the other national papers which printed coverage claiming Liverpool fans to be responsible for the disaster, including the Daily Star, withdrew their allegations and apologised the day after publication, whereas The Sun did not.

Murdoch for his part ordered MacKenzie to appear on BBC Radio 4's The World This Weekend in the aftermath of the controversy to apologise. MacKenzie said on the programme: "It was my decision and my decision alone to do that front page in that way and I made a rather serious error".

MacKenzie maintained for years that his "only mistake was to believe a Tory MP". In 1993, he told a House of Commons committee, "I regret Hillsborough. It was a fundamental mistake. The mistake was I believed what an MP said", but privately said at a 2006 dinner that he had only apologised under the instruction of Rupert Murdoch, believing: "all I did wrong was tell the truth ... I was not sorry then and I'm not sorry now". On Question Time the next year, MacKenzie publicly repeated the claims he said at the dinner; he said that he believed some of the material they published in The Sun but was not sure about all of it. He said in 2012, "Twenty-three years ago I was handed a piece of copy from a reputable news agency in Sheffield in which a senior police officer and a senior local MP were making serious allegations against fans in the stadium... these allegations were wholly untrue and were part of a concerted plot by police officers to discredit the supporters... I published in good faith and I am sorry that it was so wrong". A member of the Hillsborough Families Support Group responded "too little, too late".

Widespread boycotts of the newspaper throughout Merseyside followed immediately and continue to this day. Boycotts include both customers refusing to purchase it, and retailers refusing to stock it. The Financial Times reported in 2019 that Merseyside sales were estimated to drop from 55,000 per day to 12,000 per day, an 80% decrease. Chris Horrie estimated in 2014 that the tabloid's owners had lost £15million per month since the disaster, in 1989 prices.

The Press Council described the allegations unequivocally as "lies". The official government enquiry into the disaster dismissed the allegation that drunken Liverpool fans had been responsible for the disaster and concluded that inadequate crowd control and errors by the police had been the primary cause of the tragedy.

After editing The Sun
In January 1994, MacKenzie moved to BSkyB, another of Murdoch's News Corporation assets, but left within a few months.

In 1995, MacKenzie joined Mirror Group Newspapers and was appointed joint boss of its fledgling L!VE TV British cable television channel. The station had previously been headed by Janet Street-Porter, who had set out to establish L!VE TV as an alternative, youth-orientated station. She clashed with MacKenzie over programme content and soon left, leaving him in sole charge.

MacKenzie later said that he would agree to indulge in a "night of passion" with Janet Street-Porter and that he would be "willing" but only if she paid him £4.7m, a figure he had arrived at after calculating how much money he would lose from "loss of reputation, the negative impact on future earnings etc".

MacKenzie took a radically different approach and was criticised for producing severely down-market programming. MacKenzie introduced features such as nightly editions of 'Topless Darts' (featuring topless women playing darts on a beach), 'The Weather in Norwegian' (with a young, typically blonde and bikini-clad Scandinavian woman presenting weather forecasts in both English and Norwegian), other weather forecasts featuring dwarfs bouncing on trampolines and stock exchange reports presented by Tiffany, a young female presenter who would strip to her underwear as she read out the latest share prices. A large amount of airtime was given over to tarot card readers and astrologers. L!VE TV's best known character was the News Bunny, a man dressed as a giant rabbit who popped up during news broadcasts to give a thumbs up or a thumbs down to the various news stories to indicate whether or not he found them interesting or exciting.

L!VE TV had a budget of only £2,000 an hour and attracted a very small audience, with an average of 200,000 viewers, but it was well  known because of the controversy and criticism surrounding its programming. This led to the station being labelled "Tabloid TV" and even "Sun TV" (in reference to the newspaper, some critics accusing MacKenzie of doing nothing more than creating a television version of his old newspaper). MacKenzie has been accused of taking a "shamelessly tacky approach". He eventually left the station in 1997. He later said on LIVE TV:

 The station failed and closed.

In November 1998, MacKenzie headed a consortium, TalkCo Holdings, which purchased Talk Radio from CLT for £24.7 million. One of the financial backers was News International, News Corporation's UK subsidiary. In 1999 TalkCo was renamed The Wireless Group and in January 2000 Talk Radio was rebranded as Talksport. The Wireless Group acquired The Radio Partnership in 1999, gaining control of its nine local commercial stations. In May 2005, it was announced that the Northern Irish media company, UTV plc, had made an agreed offer to buy the company, subject to shareholder and regulatory approval. In June 2005, the takeover proceeded, with MacKenzie being replaced by UTV executive Scott Taunton. The station lost listeners during MacKenzie's tenure.

In September 2005, MacKenzie took over Highbury House Communications, a magazine publishing company based in Bournemouth and Orpington. HHC held a number of titles mainly in the leisure and computer games market with a 'ladette' title sitting uncomfortably in its portfolio. HHC was already suffering from massive debts when MacKenzie took the reins and despite efforts on his part to broker a life-line to save the ailing company, he had inherited a poisoned legacy. This venture also failed; Highbury closed in December 2005.

MacKenzie then spent a year as chairman of one of the UK's largest marketing and communications groups, Media Square plc. This was unsuccessful and MacKenzie left in March 2007.

In March 2006, MacKenzie joined BBC Radio 5 Live as a presenter. He made his debut on the station over the summer, presenting a series of programmes telling the story of various scandals which have occurred at FIFA World Cup tournaments over the years. He then presented a retrospective look at the year gone by on Christmas Day.

In May 2006, MacKenzie returned to The Sun, this time as a columnist, where he was accused of using one of his columns to launch an attack on the people of Scotland (see below). On the subject of the columns themselves, he has said "I want to get the Lonsdale Belt for vile and be personally rude to as many people as possible." In June 2011, it was announced that MacKenzie would leave The Sun to write a column for the Daily Mail. It later emerged in December 2016, during a civil case, that he had left The Sun because Rebekah Brooks, then head of News International, and Dominic Mohan, then editor of The Sun, had not told him of the extent of the company's phone hacking scandal. MacKenzie was also concerned about their employment of Jeremy Clarkson whose privacy injunction against his ex-wife was then in force. However he left the Mail in July 2012 after writing for the title for one year, citing an "increased commercial workload". Subsequently, The Guardian reported that MacKenzie's departure from the Mail was due to disagreements regarding the editing of his column.

MacKenzie was an early investor in online video company Base79, established by his son Ashley MacKenzie in 2007. They sold the firm in 2014.

In 2011 MacKenzie launched the online TV channel Sports Tonight, describing the channel as "Sky Sports News meets TalkSport". The channel received investment from former Conservative Party treasurer Lord Ashcroft, who took a minority stake.

MacKenzie joined The Daily Telegraph as an online columnist in 2013, but he was dropped by the newspaper after one column, with Roy Greenslade reporting in The Guardian that he was let go because of upset among staff on the Telegraph sports desk at his role in reporting on the Hillsborough disaster, in particular from football columnist and ex-Liverpool player Alan Hansen, who played at Hillsborough.
In April 2013, The Guardian reported that the Daily Mail was being sued for libel for £200,000 over a column by MacKenzie. The claim was brought by an NHS doctor, Antonio Serrano, whom MacKenzie had criticised in the paper.

In October 2014, MacKenzie was a contestant on gameshow Pointless Celebrities. Angered viewers complained to host Richard Osman, who said that if he had known in advance, he would not have let him appear.

In December 2014 The Sun announced that MacKenzie would make a second return to the newspaper as a columnist.

Failed political career
MacKenzie's commitment to Conservative, Thatcherite politics has led him to argue that Margaret Thatcher is the UK's greatest post-war prime minister. In 2003, he presented a documentary, Kelvin Saves the Tories, in which he proposed a low-tax, anti-BBC and cautiously pro-capital punishment manifesto for the party. However, in February 2008, in a Sun newspaper article, MacKenzie wrote that he was against the return of the death penalty.

In May 2008, MacKenzie stood for election as a local councillor in Elmbridge. He lost the election, gaining a miserly 227 votes, whereas the Conservative seat holder Glenn Dearlove won 679.

That same year, after Conservative member of parliament David Davis announced that he would resign his seat in the House of Commons in order to fight a by-election as a protest against the Labour government's plans for 42-day detention without charge for terrorist suspects, MacKenzie announced that he was likely to contest the election on a pro-42-day detention platform, stating: "I have been associated with The Sun for 30 years. The Sun is very, very hostile to David Davis because of his 28 day stance and The Sun has always been very up for 42 days and perhaps even 420 days". Off-camera, before a BBC interview, MacKenzie referred to Hull, which the Haltemprice and Howden constituency borders, as "an absolute shocker". Asked to clarify those comments, he said it was "a joke" and that he has "never actually been to Hull".

MacKenzie subsequently decided not to run for the Haltemprice and Howden seat, stating: "The clincher for me was the money. Clearly The Sun couldn't put up the cash – so I was going to have to rustle up a maximum of £100,000 to conduct my campaign."

Later developments in the Hillsborough controversy

Incidents in 2006–2007
During an after-dinner speech to Newcastle-based law firm Mincoffs Solicitors on 30 November 2006, MacKenzie is reported to have said of his coverage of the Hillsborough disaster:

MacKenzie went on to compare Merseysiders with animal rights activists. "If this got out, it would blow up all over again", MacKenzie is said to have remarked.

The remarks were met with widespread incredulity and condemnation, particularly on Merseyside, where Liverpool F.C., the local Liverpool Echo and numerous local MPs condemned MacKenzie, with Walton MP Peter Kilfoyle arguing that the quotes confirmed that MacKenzie was "never fit to edit a national newspaper". The Liverpool Echo called for The Sun to sack MacKenzie as a columnist. The Sun issued a statement saying that they had "already apologised for what happened and we stand by that apology." However, despite reports of consternation at The Sun over MacKenzie's statements, the newspaper chose to retain him as a columnist. MacKenzie refused to comment publicly on the controversy and pulled out of a scheduled appearance on BBC television's Question Time later that week.

Earlier that autumn MacKenzie had already provoked controversy in Liverpool by stating in a Press Gazette interview that he had never knowingly printed any lies in The Sun and that even stories which later turned out to be untrue were still "good stories". In relation to the publishing of false or misleading reports in The Sun, MacKenzie asked "What am I supposed to feel ashamed about?" MacKenzie was not specifically referring to the coverage of the Hillsborough disaster and made no mention of the tragedy during the interview, but the Liverpool Echo published a piece reporting MacKenzie's statements and criticising the apparent lack of shame or regret over the Hillsborough coverage implied by them (and the fact that MacKenzie may still regard the misleading coverage as a "good story").

Although there was actually little reaction to the quotes on Merseyside at the time, they did draw comment from Phil Hammond, chairman of the Hillsborough Family Support Group, who said: "I can't believe that even after all these years, there is no remorse or regret for the hurt he caused". It was still thought at this point however that, although MacKenzie appeared not to regret the coverage, he no longer regarded it as having any factual basis after his apparent admissions in the past that the allegations made were lies fed to him by police officers and a Conservative MP.

In February 2007, Independent journalist Matthew Norman claimed that MacKenzie was considering issuing a public apology for his coverage of the Hillsborough disaster, although at the time he was "still unsure" as to whether to do so. His former colleague at The Sun, Roy Greenslade has suggested that the real reason why MacKenzie may be so hesitant to apologise and admit the inaccuracy of the coverage may be his "anti-Scouse" bias, which Greenslade suspects makes it difficult for MacKenzie to "bring himself to say sorry to the city's people".

Fan exoneration (2012)
On 12 September 2012, following the publication of the official report into the disaster using previously withheld government papers which has exonerated the Liverpool fans present at the match, MacKenzie issued the following statement:

Trevor Hicks, chairman of the Hillsborough Family Support Group, rejected Mr MacKenzie's apology as "too little, too late", calling him "lowlife, clever lowlife, but lowlife".
The copy from White's news agency was available to other newspapers, who reported the story as allegations – The Sun reported the allegations, on McKenzie's say-so, as 'the truth'.

Following the Warrington Inquests verdicts, Mackenzie was door-stepped by Alex Thomson of Channel 4 News. He was filmed pleading "Please Alex, this isn't reasonable". Nine complaints were received by Ofcom asserting MacKenzie's privacy had been invaded, but in its adjudication, the regulator rejected the application.

Comments in 2016–2017
Despite apologising on a number of platforms, in 2016, MacKenzie made a joke in The Sun newspaper that if it was true that George Osborne (the then Chancellor of the Exchequer) was putting gongs up for sale, he should be made Lord MacKenzie of Anfield (Liverpool FC's home stadium).

A day before the 28th anniversary of the Hillsborough disaster in April 2017, MacKenzie's column in The Sun mentioned the Everton footballer Ross Barkley appearing to imply Barkley deserved to be beaten up in a nightclub incident earlier in the week. Comparing the player to a "gorilla at the zoo", MacKenzie was accused of racism (Barkley is of part-Nigerian descent). The column was removed from the newspaper's website on the afternoon of its day of publication. Later in the day, a spokesman for the newspaper apologised "for the offence caused" and said the columnist "has been suspended from the paper with immediate effect. The views expressed by Kelvin Mackenzie about the people of Liverpool were wrong, unfunny and are not the view of the paper". A month after the column appeared, it was announced that MacKenzie's "contract with News Group Newspapers", the Suns publishers, "has been terminated by mutual consent".

In response to MacKenzie's article, on the day of its publication Everton FC banned The Sun and its reporters "from all areas of its operation" following Liverpool FC who had made such a decision about The Sun in February 2017.

Views
Racism
MacKenzie has been repeatedly embroiled in racist scandals. His editorship of The Sun included overseeing the headline "Would You Let This Man Near Your Daughter?" in relation to Benjamin Zephaniah, stating that: 

Scotland
MacKenzie has criticised Scotland, although he is of Scottish descent – his grandfather was from Stirling.

In July 2006, MacKenzie wrote a column for The Sun referring to Scots as "Tartan Tosspots" and apparently rejoicing in the fact that Scotland has a lower life expectancy than the rest of the United Kingdom. MacKenzie's column provoked a storm of protest and was heavily condemned by numerous commentators including Scottish MPs and MSPs.

On 11 October 2007, MacKenzie appeared on the BBC's Question Time TV programme and launched another attack on Scotland. During a debate about tax, MacKenzie said that:
The comments came as part of criticism of prime minister Gordon Brown, whom MacKenzie said could not be trusted to manage the British economy because he was "a socialist Scot", and stating that this was relevant to the debate. Fellow panellist Chuka Umunna from the think tank Compass called his comments "absolutely disgraceful", and booing and jeering were heard from the Cheltenham studio audience. The BBC received around 200 complaints and MacKenzie's comments drew widespread criticism, including comments from the Scottish entrepreneur Duncan Bannatyne who responded on BBC Radio 5 Live:

On 13 January 2012, MacKenzie once again appeared on the BBC's Question Time  and remarked on the move for Scottish independence: 

Hijabs
In July 2016, after the Nice (France) truck attack, MacKenzie wrote an article for The Sun in which he queried whether it was appropriate for Channel 4 News presenter Fatima Manji to read the news wearing a hijab. Manji accused MacKenzie of attempting to "intimidate Muslims out of public life" and attempting to smear 1.6 billion Muslims in suggesting they are inherently violent. She said, "He has attempted to smear half of them further by suggesting they are helpless slaves. And he has attempted to smear me by suggesting I would sympathise with a terrorist".

The Independent Press Standards Organisation (IPSO) received 17 complaints about Manji wearing the hijab, an objection which was rejected. Eventually, the IPSO received 1,700 complaints about MacKenzie's article. The IPSO ruled in October 2016 that MacKenzie was "entitled" to make his comments, and a "prejudicial or pejorative reference" to Manji's religion was not present in the article. Manji said the ruling meant it was now "open season on minorities, and Muslims in particular".

Irish
In December 2020, MacKenzie expressed that the Irish love the Germans and did not fight to save Jewish people in World War II. An estimated 70,000 Irish citizens served in the British Armed Forces, along with an estimated 50,000 from Northern Ireland. This does not include those already in Britain.

Personal life
MacKenzie married Jacqueline Holland in 1968 in Camberwell. They had a daughter (born 1969) and two sons (born 1972 and 1974). His elder son and his daughter worked at Talkradio. In the late 1990s, MacKenzie was featured in The Mail on Sunday'', holidaying in what the paper described as a "love nest" in Barbados with News International secretary Joanna Duckworth.

References

External links
 Sport Relief Does The Apprentice – Official Website
 His Scottish family tree

1946 births
Anglo-Scots
British male journalists
British media executives
British newspaper editors
English people of Scottish descent
Hillsborough disaster
Living people
People educated at Alleyn's School
People from Meopham
People from Weybridge
The Sun (United Kingdom) editors